is a 2012 Japanese film directed by Nobuhiro Doi.

Plot
A man's body is found under the statue of a winged kirin in the Nihombashi area of Tokyo. A suspect named Yashima has a car accident and falls unconscious while he is attempting to run away. Yashima's lover Kaori comes from Fukushima and tells detectives that he is absolutely not a criminal. Meanwhile, Detective Kyoichiro Kaga's (Hiroshi Abe) investigates and uncovers a point of contact between the dead body and Yashima. A hidden fact of the victim is revealed which even his children did not know about...

Cast
 Hiroshi Abe
 Yui Aragaki
 Kiichi Nakai
 Junpei Mizobata
 Rena Tanaka
 Tori Matsuzaka
 Kento Yamazaki
 Seiya
 Seika Taketomi
 Takahiro Miura
 Hitori Gekidan
 Meisa Kuroki
 Natsuko Akiyama
 Tsutomu Yamazaki (Special appearance)
 Yutaka Matsushige
 Shingo Tsurumi
 Yutaka Matsushige
 Tokio Emoto

See also
 Shinzanmono

References

External links
  
 

Films directed by Nobuhiro Doi
2012 films
Films based on Japanese novels
Films based on works by Keigo Higashino
Films with screenplays by Takeharu Sakurai
2010s Japanese films

ko:기린의 날개#영화
ja:麒麟の翼#映画